The Women's 4 × 100 m freestyle relay event at the 2010 South American Games was held on March 28 at 18:35.

Medalists

Records

Results

Final

References
Final

Relay 4x100m W